Vice Admiral Sir Andrew David Hugh Mathews KCB FREng (born 27 June 1958) is a senior Royal Navy officer who was Chief of Materiél (Fleet), Royal Navy.

Naval career
Mathews served as commander of HM Naval Base Devonport. Promoted to rear admiral, Mathews was appointed Director-General Nuclear and Controller of the Navy in 2006. He went on to be Director-General Submarines in 2007 and then, following promotion to vice admiral, Mathews was appointed Chief of Materiel (Fleet) and Chief of Fleet Support in 2009, a post he stood down from in December 2013.

Already a Companion of the Order of the Bath (CB), Mathews was appointed Knight Commander of the Order of the Bath in the 2013 New Year Honours.

References

|-

1958 births
Living people
Royal Navy vice admirals
Knights Commander of the Order of the Bath
Military personnel from Essex
People from Stanford-le-Hope